Klaudia Konieczna (born 7 September 1995) is a Polish volleyball player. She plays for Karpaty Krosno, having formerly played for PTPS Piła in the Orlen Liga.

References

Living people
1995 births
Polish women's volleyball players
People from Kościan
20th-century Polish women
21st-century Polish women